Monoxenus balteatus is a species of beetle in the family Cerambycidae. It was described by Per Olof Christopher Aurivillius in 1903.

References

balteatus
Beetles described in 1903